Van is a city located in southeastern Van Zandt County, Texas, United States about 26 miles northwest of Tyler. Its population was 2,632 at the 2010 census. The town draws its name from an early settler and school teacher Henry Vance.

History
Van's first settlers in the area had arrived by the time of the Civil War. By 1874, the town was named Swindall for George Swindall, who donated land for a school west of the present business district and land north of that site in 1891 to the Methodist Church. In 1894, schoolteacher Henry Vance, the town's namesake, established a post office, and the name Van was chosen when the post office renamed the community.

A Pure Oil company survey near the town in 1927 led to the discovery of oil at the property on October 13, 1929, with the Jarmon No.1 well. Sun Oil, Shell Petroleum, the Texas Company, Pure Oil, and Humble became co-owners of the field, with Pure Oil as chief operator. By 1994, the Van Field had produced 502 million barrels of oil.

Van experienced an overnight oil boom, growing from a rural farming community with a school and post office, to an oil boomtown where 30 buildings, including hotels and stores, had been constructed in only 10 days.  In 1930, the Texas Short Line Railway was extended from Grand Saline. The population numbered 894 throughout the 1930s. The population declined to 620 during World War II, as workers moved away to jobs in war-related industry, but increased steadily thereafter. Businesses in the community fluctuated from a high of 50 in 1934 to a low of 15 in 1945, but remained between 30 and 40 throughout most of the town's history. Mechanization of the oilfield occurred in the 1940s, and by the 1950s, Van had a Humble Oil refinery, five churches, and a consolidated independent school district. A total of 591 wells made up the Van field when Pure Oil became a division of Union Oil in 1965. The population of Van grew from 1,103 in 1962 to 1,820 by 1974. The population reached just over 2,600 residents in 2013.

May 2015 tornado
On May 10, 2015, shortly after sunset, Van was struck by a strong tornado during the May 5–10, 2015 tornado outbreak sequence. According to the National Weather Service and tornado chasers, a severe thunderstorm spawned a tornado that touched down in a heavily wooded thicket just south of Van Zandt County Road 4609, just west of the small community of Primrose, 10 miles south of Van. The tornado path moved in a direct line north, crossing Texas State Highway 64, picking up strength as it crossed the Neches River, and then Interstate 20 just south of the town. The tornado went straight into the heart of Van, causing heavy damage to structures in the town. It destroyed the elementary school in the city that was a historical monument and then moved straight north through residential neighborhoods, destroying homes and causing massive structural damage. The tornado continued in a straight line north towards Grand Saline. The tornado dissipated 3.5 miles north of Van. Numerous homes and mobile homes were damaged or destroyed, and many trees and power lines were downed throughout Van. A nearby metal-frame industrial building was destroyed. A few well-built frame homes in the northern part of town were left with only interior walls standing. An oil pump derrick toppled to the ground, along with a large metal high-tension truss tower. Several barns and outbuildings were destroyed, as well. Two people were killed and 47 were injured, prompting local emergency management officials to declare a mass-casualty incident. The following day, the tornado was given a rating of EF3 from the National Weather Service office in Fort Worth.

Geography

Van is located at  (32.526029, –95.636493).  According to the United States Census Bureau, the city has a total area of 3.0 sq mi (7.7 km2), all of it land.

Transportation
Van is served by:
 Interstate 20 is south of downtown Van.
 State Highway 110 is designated as Maple Street in the city; it runs southeast toward Tyler and north to Grand Saline.
 Farm to Market Road 16 is designated as Main Street in the city limits; the road runs west to near Canton and east toward Lindale.
 Farm to Market Road 314 is marked as Oak Street; Van is the northern terminus of this road that runs south toward Brownsboro, just west of Tyler.
 Farm to Market Road 1805  runs from Van and connects to FM 1253 into nearby Smith County.

Demographics

As of the 2020 United States census, there were 2,664 people, 951 households, and 710 families residing in the city.

Education
Van is served by the Van Independent School District and home to the Van High School Vandals. It is also in the Tyler Junior College taxing district, as many residents attend the school.

Notable people
 Dan Flynn, a businessman and rancher from Van, is a Republican member of the Texas House of Representatives
 Todd Fowler, a former professional football player
 Adrian Hall, a theatre director

Gallery

References

External links
 Van Banner newspaper
 KWJB RADIO the official website of the only broadcasting station in Van Zandt County

Cities in Van Zandt County, Texas
Cities in Texas